Lupe Diaz is an American politician and pastor serving as a member of the Arizona House of Representatives from the 19th district. He assumed office on November 23, 2021.

Early life and education 
A native of Bisbee, Arizona, Diaz graduated from Bisbee High School. He earned a Bachelor of Arts degree in theological studies from the School of Bible Theology in San Jacinto, California.

Career 
Since 1988, Diaz has worked as a pastor at Grace Chapel Benson in Benson, Arizona. He also served as a member of the Benson City Council. Diaz is also the president of Grace Christian Center Inc., a non-profit organization. He is also the principal of Grace Christian Academy. Diaz was appointed to the Arizona House of Representatives by the Cochise County Board of Supervisors in November 2021, succeeding Becky Nutt.

References 

Living people
People from Bisbee, Arizona
People from Benson, Arizona
Republican Party members of the Arizona House of Representatives
21st-century American politicians
Year of birth missing (living people)
Hispanic and Latino American state legislators in Arizona
American politicians of Mexican descent